Willi Kürten (4 April 1908 – 18 July 1944) was a German hurdler. He competed in the men's 400 metres hurdles at the 1936 Summer Olympics. He was killed in action during World War II.

References

1908 births
1944 deaths
Athletes (track and field) at the 1936 Summer Olympics
German male hurdlers
Olympic athletes of Germany
Place of birth missing
German military personnel killed in World War II